These are the official results of the men's decathlon at the 1996 Summer Olympics in Atlanta, Georgia.

Medalists

Schedule

July 31 

August 1

Records

Results

See also
1995 Men's World Championships Decathlon
1996 Hypo-Meeting
1996 Decathlon Year Ranking
1997 Men's World Championships Decathlon

References

External links
Official Report
Results

Decathlon
1996
Men's events at the 1996 Summer Olympics